is a Buddhist temple in the city of Tateyama in Chiba Prefecture, and is a temple of the Chizen Sect of Shingon Buddhism.
According to tradition, the temple was founded by Gyōki (668 - 749) in 717 early in the Nara period. It was later revived by a visit by the Tendai Buddhist priest Ennin (794 - 864) early in the Heian period. The date at which the temple returned to the Shingon sect is unknown. The temple received a juinjō (朱印状) seal of certification from the Tokugawa shogunate during the Edo period.

Kannon-dō 
The temple is well known for its  hall dedicated to the Goddess Kannon, which is situated on a sheer cliff of the boat-shaped Mount Funakata. For this reason the Kannon-dō is also known as the Cliff Kannon-dō . In the rear of the hall is a 1.5 meter tall statue of the Goddess Kannon. The Kannon-dō is designated as a Tangible Cultural Property by Tateyama City.

Transportation 
Daifuku-ji is located in the Funakata District of Tateyama. It is accessible by foot from Nakofunakata Station, JR East Uchibō Line.

Sources 

大福寺(崖の観音) 
 

Religious organizations established in the 8th century
Buddhist temples in Chiba Prefecture
Tateyama, Chiba
Shingon temples